Cumberland, an electoral district of the Legislative Assembly in the Australian state of New South Wales was created in 1920 and abolished in 1927.


Election results

Elections in the 1920s

1926 appointment
William FitzSimons died on 20 March 1926. Between 1920 and 1927 the Legislative Assembly was elected using a form of proportional representation with multi-member seats and a single transferable vote (modified Hare-Clark). The Parliamentary Elections (Casual Vacancies) Act, provided that casual vacancies were filled by the next unsuccessful candidate on the incumbent member's party list. James Shand was the only unsuccessful  candidate at the 1925 election and took his seat on 22 September 1926.

1925

1922

1920

References

New South Wales state electoral results by district